Hamin Ahmed (born 8 March 1965) is a Bangladeshi musician. He is a member of the rock band Miles.

Early life and career
Ahmed is the son of Kamal Das Gupta, a music director and Firoza Begum, a Nazrul Sangeet singer. Ahmed first studied in a school in Kolkata. Then he moved to Dhaka and studied in Notre Dame College. He finished his education in the Department of Public Administration in University of Dhaka. His younger brother Shafin Ahmed was a fellow member of Miles.

Business affairs
Ahmed started his own computer business venture, DataTech in 1987. Later, he joined ACI in 1992. Besides he has his own businesses to run.

Personal life
Ahmed has three children. One of them is Ahnaf Ahmed (born 1995). In early days, Ahmed played cricket with the clubs – Surja Tarun, Azad Boys, Abahani, Mohammedan and KCSO Boys.

Discography

Band 

 Miles(মাইল) (1982)
  A Step Farther (আরও এক ধাপ) (1986)
 "প্রতিশ্রুতি(Promise)" (1991)
 "প্রত্যাশা (Expectation)" (1993)
 "প্রত্যয় (Belief)" (1996)
 "প্রয়াস (Attempt). (1997)
 "প্রবাহ (Flow)" (2000)
 "প্রতিধ্বনি (Echoes)" (2006)
 "প্রতিচ্ছবি (Reflections)" (2015)

Extended Play
 "প্রবর্তন (Induction)" (2016)

Compilation albums
 Best of Miles (মাইলসের সেরা) (1994)
 প্রিয়তমা] (Darling) (?)
 ফিরিয়ে দাও (Give [it] Back) (?)

References

External links

Living people
Bangladeshi male musicians
20th-century Bangladeshi male singers
20th-century Bangladeshi singers
University of Dhaka alumni
Bangladeshi guitarists
Notre Dame College, Dhaka alumni
1959 births
21st-century Bangladeshi male singers
21st-century Bangladeshi singers
Musicians from West Bengal